Knattspyrnufélag Vesturbæjar, commonly known as KV, is an Icelandic sports club from the capital city, Reykjavík in the area of Vesturbær. It is best known for its football team but has also fielded teams in other sports, such as basketball and handball.

Men's football

Grounds
KV plays its games on the pitch next to Úrvalsdeild karla side, KR's KR-völlur.

History
In 2009 and 2011, the club was promoted to the 2. deild karla. The team finished 4th out of 12 teams in 2012, only one win from promotion to the 1. division. In 2013 the club was promoted to the 1. deild karla, the highest level the club has played at in its history.

Honours
2. deild karla
Runner-ups: 2013

3. deild karla
Winners: 2020
Winners: 2011
Runner-ups: 2009

Current squad

Basketball

The KV men's basketball team was founded in 2007 and has played in the Icelandic basketball league system since the 2010-2011 2. deild karla season.

References

External links
 Official Website

Football clubs in Iceland